George Henry Hall may refer to:
 George Hall, 1st Viscount Hall (1881–1965), British Labour politician
 George Henry Hall (artist) (1825–1913), American still-life and landscape artist